"Policy of Truth" is a song by English electronic music band Depeche Mode, released on 7 May 1990 as the third single from their seventh studio album, Violator (1990). It is the only Depeche Mode single to chart higher on the US Billboard Hot 100 chart (number 15) than on the UK Singles Chart (number 16), and it became the band's second chart-topper on the Billboard Modern Rock Tracks chart.

Critical reception
Jon Wilde from Melody Maker commented, "Depeche has never sounded som cute as they did on their recent hit, "Enjoy the Silence". Then again, they have rarely sounded quite as ineffectual as this, not since the days when they were busy composing jingles for the mix 'n' match department of Woolworths (Basildon)."

Remixes
François Kevorkian mixed a new single version for the release, extending it slightly while lowering the tempo, and also making Dave Gahan's vocals more prominent. He also mixed the Beat Box Mix (the 12-inch version of the single mix) and the Pavlov's Dub.

The Trancentral Mix is by The KLF, a popular acid house band at that time that only did remix work for other artists on 3 occasions (the others being "So Hard" and its B-side "It Must Be Obvious" by the Pet Shop Boys and "What Is Dub?" by Moody Boys).

The "Capitol Mix" uses the sample "I want to tell you my side of the case" from the Checkers speech by Richard Nixon.

A version of "Kaleid" was used as intro music for Depeche Mode's World Violation Tour in 1990.

Music video
The accompanying music video for "Policy of Truth" is directed by Anton Corbijn and appears on the VHS collection Strange Too.

Track listings
All songs were written by Martin L. Gore.

7-inch, cassette: Mute / Bong19, CBong19 (UK)
 "Policy of Truth" (5:10)
 "Kaleid" (4:17)

12-inch: Mute / 12Bong19 (UK)
 "Policy of Truth [Beat Box Mix] [Edit]" (6:30) (remixed by François Kevorkian)
 "Policy of Truth [Capitol Mix]" (8:00) (remixed by François Kevorkian)
 "Kaleid [When Worlds Mix]" (5:22) (remixed by Daniel Miller and George Holt)

12-inch: Mute / L12Bong19 (UK)
 "Policy of Truth [Trancentral Mix]" (5:55) (remixed by The KLF)
 "Kaleid [Remix]" (4:36) (remixed by Bruce Smith and Sean Oliver)
 "Policy of Truth [Pavlov's Dub]" (6:02) (remixed by François Kevorkian)

CD: Mute / CDBong19 (UK)
 "Policy of Truth [Beat Box Mix Edit]" (6:31)
 "Policy of Truth [Capitol Mix]" (8:00)
 "Kaleid [Remix]" (4:36)

CD: Mute / LCDBong19 (UK)
 "Policy of Truth" [Trancentral Mix] (5:55)
 "Kaleid" [When Worlds Mix] (5:22)
 "Policy of Truth" [Pavlov’s Dub] (6:02)
 "Policy of Truth" [7-inch Version] (5:08)
 "Kaleid [7-inch Version] (4:16)

CD: Mute / CDBong19X (EU; 2004)
 "Policy of Truth" (5:10)
 "Kaleid" (4:17)
 "Policy of Truth [Beat Box Mix]" (7:13)
 "Policy of Truth [Capitol Mix]" (8:00)
 "Kaleid [When Worlds Mix]" (5:22)
 "Policy of Truth [Trancentral Mix]" (5:55)
 "Kaleid [Remix]" (4:36)
 "Policy of Truth [Pavlov's Dub]" (6:02)

CD: Sire/Reprise / 9 21534-2 (US)
 "Policy of Truth" (5:10)
 "Policy of Truth [Capitol Mix]" (8:00)
 "Policy of Truth [Beat Box Mix]" (7:13)
 "Kaleid [Remix]" (4:36)
 "Policy of Truth [Pavlov's Dub]" (6:02)
 "Pavlov's Dub" is mislabeled on the Sire/Reprise version's cover art as the "Trancentral Mix"

Charts

Weekly charts

Year-end charts

See also
 List of Billboard Modern Rock Tracks Number Ones of the 1990s

References

External links
 Single information from the official Depeche Mode website
 AllMusic review 
 

1989 songs
1990 singles
Depeche Mode songs
Music videos directed by Anton Corbijn
Mute Records singles
Song recordings produced by Flood (producer)
Songs written by Martin Gore